The 2014 Dubai Tennis Championships (also known as the 2014 Dubai Duty Free Tennis Championships for sponsorship reasons) was a 500 event on the 2014 ATP World Tour and a Premier event on the 2014 WTA Tour. Both of the events took place at the Aviation Club Tennis Centre in Dubai, United Arab Emirates. The women's tournament took place February 17 to 22, while the men's tournament took place from February 24 to March 1.

Points and prize money

Point distribution

Prize money

* per team

ATP singles main-draw entrants

Seeds 

 Rankings are as of February 17, 2014.

Other entrants 
The following players received wildcards into the singles main draw:
  Somdev Devvarman
  Malek Jaziri
  James Ward

The following players received entry from the qualifying draw:
  Marius Copil
  Thiemo de Bakker
  Lukáš Lacko
  Adrian Ungur

Retirements 
  Juan Martín del Potro (wrist injury)

Withdrawals
During the tournament
  Nikolay Davydenko (left rib injury)
  Mikhail Youzhny (illness)

ATP doubles main-draw entrants

Seeds 

 Rankings are as of February 17, 2014.

Other entrants 
The following pairs received wildcards into the doubles main draw:
  Omar Alawadhi /  Hamad Abbas Janahi
  Novak Djokovic /  Carlos Gómez-Herrera

The following pair received entry from the qualifying draw:
  Nikolay Davydenko /  Victor Hănescu

Withdrawals 
During the tournament
  Juan Martín del Potro (wrist injury)

WTA singles main-draw entrants

Seeds 

 Rankings are as of February 10, 2014.

Other entrants 
The following players received wildcards into the singles main draw:
  Nadia Petrova
  Serena Williams
  Venus Williams

The following players received entry from the qualifying draw:
  Annika Beck 
  Flavia Pennetta
  Karolína Plíšková
  Maryna Zanevska

Withdrawals
Before the tournament
  Svetlana Kuznetsova → replaced by Alizé Cornet

Retirements
  Simona Halep (right ankle injury)

WTA doubles main-draw entrants

Seeds 

 Rankings are as of February 10, 2014.

Other entrants 
The following pairs received wildcards into the doubles main draw:
  Kirsten Flipkens /  Petra Kvitová
  Flavia Pennetta /  Samantha Stosur
  Serena Williams /  Venus Williams

Withdrawals
Before the tournament
  Kristýna Plíšková (visa issues)

Champions

Men's singles

  Roger Federer def.  Tomáš Berdych, 3–6, 6–4, 6–3

Women's singles

  Venus Williams def.  Alizé Cornet, 6–3, 6–0

Men's doubles

   Rohan Bopanna /  Aisam-ul-Haq Qureshi def.  Daniel Nestor /  Nenad Zimonjić, 6–4, 6–3

Women's doubles

  Alla Kudryavtseva /  Anastasia Rodionova def.  Raquel Kops-Jones /  Abigail Spears, 6–2, 5–7, [10–8]

References

External links
 Official website

 
2014
Dubai Tennis Championships
Dubai Tennis Championships
Dubai Tennis Championships
Dubai Tennis Championships